The Release of Dan Forbes is a 1916 American silent short drama film directed by Donald MacDonald starring Helen Rosson, William Stowell, and Harry Van Meter.

External links

1916 films
1916 drama films
Silent American drama films
American silent short films
American black-and-white films
1916 short films
1910s American films
1910s English-language films
American drama short films